is a Japanese actress, voice actress and narrator from Tokyo, Japan. She is most known for the roles of Reika "Ochoufujin" Ryuuzaki in Aim for the Ace!, Nodoka Saotome in Ranma ½, Maetel in Galaxy Express 999, Michiko in Harmagedon, and for being the Japanese voice-over actress of Audrey Hepburn.

Filmography

Television animation
1960s
Princess Knight (1967) – Eros
Judo Boy (1969) – Narieta
Kamui the Ninja (1969) – Nene
1970s
Pinocchio: The Series (1972) – The Blue Fairy
Aim for the Ace! (1973) – Reika "Ochoufujin" Ryuuzaki
3000 Leagues in Search of Mother (1976) – Cipriana
Galaxy Express 999 (1978) – Maetel
The Story of Perrine (1978) – Marie Paindavoine
1980s
Patalliro! (1982) – Etrange, Patalliro's mother.
Aura Battler Dunbine (1983) – Silkey Mau
Stop!! Hibari-kun! (1983) – Harue
Bagi, the Monster of Mighty Nature (1984) – Ryo's Mother
The Story of Pollyanna, Girl of Love (1986) – Ruth Carew
1990s
Sunset on Third Street (1990) – Tomoe Suzuki
Ranma ½ (1992) – Nodoka Saotome
Romeo's Blue Skies (1995) – Narrator
Weiß Kreuz (1998) – Kaoruko Amamiya
Kindaichi Case Files (1999) – Hazuki Asaki
2000s
Sakura Wars (2000) – Wakana Shinguji 
Monster (2004) – Leia
Nagasarete Airantou (2007) – Suzuran
Kon'nichiwa Anne: Before Green Gables (2009) – Narrator
2010s
Katanagatari (2010) – Narrator

OVA
Devilman: The birth (1987) – Sumiko Fudo
Vampire Princess Miyu (1988) – Miyu's Mother
Legend of the Galactic Heroes: The Gaiden (1998) – Johanna von Basel
Maetel Legend (2000) - Maetel
Yukikaze (2002) – Lynn Jackson

Theatrical animation
Queen Millennia (1982) – Cleopatra
Genma Taisen (1983) – Michiko Azuma
X (1996) – Tōru Shirō
Mobile Suit Gundam Special Edition (2000) – Kamaria Ray

Tokusatsu
Ultraman Story (1984) – Mother of Ultra
Ultraman Mebius (2006) – Mother of Ultra

Video games
Lunar 2: Eternal Blue Complete (1998) - Luna
Dissidia Final Fantasy (2008) - Cloud of Darkness
Kingdom Hearts Birth by Sleep (2010) - Kairi's Grandmother
Final Fantasy Type-0 (2011) - Cadetmaster
Final Fantasy XIV: A Realm Reborn (2013) - Hydaelyn

Dubbing

Live-action
Audrey Hepburn
Roman Holiday (1972 Fuji TV and 1979 TV Asahi edition) – Princess Ann
Sabrina – Sabrina Fairchild
War and Peace – Natasha Rostova
Funny Face – Jo Stockton
Love in the Afternoon – Ariane Chavasse
The Nun's Story (1974 TV Asahi edition) – Sister Luke
The Unforgiven – Rachel Zachary
Breakfast at Tiffany's – Holly Golightly / Lula Mae Barnes
The Children's Hour – Karen Wright
Charade – Regina "Reggie" Lampert
My Fair Lady – Eliza Doolittle
Paris When It Sizzles – Gabrielle Simpson
How to Steal a Million – Nicole Bonnet
Two for the Road – Joanna 'Jo' Wallace
Wait Until Dark (1975 TV Asahi edition) – Susy Hendrix
Robin and Marian – Lady Marian
Bloodline – Elizabeth Roffe
Always (1995 NTV edition) – Hap
Audrey – Audrey Hepburn
Airport 1975 (1977 Fuji TV edition) – Sister Ruth (Helen Reddy)
Amélie – Madeleine Wallace (Yolande Moreau)
Armour of God II: Operation Condor – Momoko
Back to the Future Part III (1993 TV Asahi edition) – Clara Clayton (Mary Steenburgen)
The Chronicles of Riddick – Aereon (Judi Dench)
Glee – Patti LuPone
Kramer vs. Kramer – Joanna Kramer (Meryl Streep)
La Piscine (1978 TV Asahi edition) – Marianne (Romy Schneider)
The Manchurian Candidate – Senator Eleanor Prentiss Shaw (Meryl Streep)
Marnie (1969 TV Asahi edition) – Lil Mainwaring (Diane Baker)
Oblivion – Sally (Melissa Leo)
The Plague of the Zombies – Sylvia Forbes (Diane Clare)
The Reptile – Valerie Spalding (Jennifer Daniel)
The River Wild – Gail Hartman (Meryl Streep)
Singin' in the Rain – Kathy Selden (Debbie Reynolds)
Smash – Liza Minnelli
The Towering Inferno (1989 TBS edition) – Susan Franklin (Faye Dunaway)

Animation
Charlotte's Web – Charlotte A. Cavatica
Hercules – Hera

Other roles
Izumi e no michi (1955, film) – Misako Ogawa
Haromoni@ (2007–08, variety show) – Narrator
Aoi Honō (2014, TV drama) – Maetel (voice)

Awards

References

External links
 

1939 births
Living people
Japanese child actresses
Japanese video game actresses
Japanese voice actresses
Tokyo Actor's Consumer's Cooperative Society voice actors
Voice actresses from Tokyo
20th-century Japanese actresses
21st-century Japanese actresses